Willard Charles Dewveall (April 29, 1936November 20, 2006) was an American football end, the first player to jump from the National Football League to the American Football League.

He left the Chicago Bears of the NFL after the 1960 season to play for the AFL champion Houston Oilers. He was the only one to switch leagues for five years, until kicker Pete Gogolak went from the AFL to the NFL in 1966.

In 1962, Dewveall caught the (then) longest pass reception for a touchdown in professional football history, 98 yards, from Jacky Lee, against the San Diego Chargers. It is still the longest receiving touchdown in Houston Oilers/Tennessee Titans franchise history. He was an American Football League All-Star in 1962.

He was Dandy Don's favorite receiver, and All-American at SMU.
Selected by the Bears in the second round of the 1958 NFL draft, Dewveall played a year in the Canadian Football League with the Winnipeg Blue Bombers in 1958 under head coach Bud Grant, and they won the Grey Cup. He returned to the United States and played for the Bears for two seasons in 1959 and 1960.

See also
 List of American Football League players

References

External links
 
 

1936 births
2006 deaths
American football ends
Chicago Bears players
Houston Oilers players
SMU Mustangs football players
Sportspeople from the Dallas–Fort Worth metroplex
American Football League All-Star players
People from Springtown, Texas
Players of American football from Texas
American Football League players